Elise Golgowski is an American actress, playwright, and film maker in Los Angeles, CA.

Early life 
Originally from Orlando, FL she attended Valencia Community College for her Associates in Theatre before transferring to the University of Southern California where she received her Bachelors in Theatre.

Career

Acting 
"As an actress she has worked with: Disney, Hard Rock Company, Williamstown Theatre Festival, Valencia Character Company, Slanderous Tongues, Mad Cow Theatre, Orlando Shakespeare Company, Checkerboard Productions at the Florida Fringe Festival, Brand New Theatre, Women’s Theatre Organization at USC, Fullsail Films, Divine Distractions, and several college film schools and independent productions."
At USC she portrayed Mrs. Gottlieb in Dead Man's Cell Phone by Sarah Ruhl and Janie in One Man's Trash by Zury Margarita Ruiz.

Playwrighting 
Elise has had three plays produced: The Dumpster Boy and the Chicken Girl, Make My Van Gogh, and The Caterpillar's Dilemma. 
Her play The Dumpster Boy and the Chicken Girl was nominated for a Theatre Student Association award for Best Student Written Work at USC in spring of 2011. In the summer of 2011 she performed Make My Van Gogh, a solo play, at the Open Fist Theatre for the Hollywood Fringe Festival. The USC student group Brand New Theatre produced The Caterpillar's Dilemma for their spring 2012 one act festival.

Film making 
Elise creates her own independent films with her production company Mojave Films. Her short art house films Bike Traffick and Dada Suicide have been featured in a theatre course taught at USC.

References

External links 
 
 Brand New Theatre
 The Hollywood Fringe Festival

Year of birth missing (living people)
Living people
American filmmakers
Actresses from Orlando, Florida
Writers from Orlando, Florida
American dramatists and playwrights
USC School of Dramatic Arts alumni
21st-century American women